Kimiko Soldati (born April 10, 1974) is an American diver. She competed at the 2004 Summer Olympics in Athens, in the women's 3 meter springboard. Soldati was born in Longmont, Colorado.

References

1974 births
Living people
American female divers
Olympic divers of the United States
Divers at the 2004 Summer Olympics
21st-century American women